Book of Roads and Kingdoms or Book of Highways and Kingdoms is the name of an eleventh-century geography text by Abu Abdullah al-Bakri. 

It was written in 1067-8 in Córdoba, al-Andalus (present day Spain). Al-Bakri based his work on the accounts of traders, the writings of Muhammad ibn Yūsuf al-Warrāq, (On the Topography of North Africa), and Abraham ben Jacob. Despite the fact that al-Bakri never left al-Andalus, his writings are regarded as objectively reporting the accounts of other travelers by contemporary historians, and much of what he wrote is substantiated in other sources.

He described a wide array of regions from the Atlantic Ocean, through the Sahara, to Central Africa, giving descriptions of the geography, people, culture and political situation in each region. The Book of Roads and Kingdoms exists today only in fragmentary form. It is sometimes confused with a work by the same name written in the ninth century by Ibn Khordadbeh.

References

Islamic-spain.tv: Geography and al-Andalus - Website of a documentary on the rise, reign, and fall of Islamic Spain.

Geographical works of the medieval Islamic world
11th-century Arabic books
History of the Sahara
Geography of Africa